Phong Châu was the capital city of Văn Lang (now Viet Nam) for the most part of the Hồng Bàng period, from the Third dynasty to the eighteenth dynasty of Hùng kings.

History
The historical site was the third capital of Văn Lang, following the previous capital Nghĩa Lĩnh. Its ruins are located near Bạch Hạc District, Việt Trì, Phú Thọ Province, and also the name of Phong Châu district, Phú Thọ province. The 15th century book Đại Việt sử ký toàn thư (Đại Việt Complete History) gave more information about Phong Châu.

According to legend, the site was where Âu Cơ, wife of King Lạc Long Quân, gave birth to their children, commemorated at the Hùng Temple in modern Phong Châu district, Phú Thọ province. For this reason, the history of Phú Thọ province is closely linked to that of the country itself.

Its eventual downfall was due to the weakening of the Hùng king, following the rise of foreign powers. In 258 BC, the Âu Việt tribes under the leadership of Thục Phán sacked Phong Châu during their invasion of Văn Lang. With the end of the Hùng King Epoch, the seat of government moved to Cổ Loa.

See also
List of historical capitals of Vietnam

Other people from Phong Châu
 Kiều Công Tiễn
 Kiều Công Hãn (vi), a warlord who held Phong Châu, Bạch Hạc, Phu Tho Province, during the Anarchy of the 12 Warlords.

References

Archaeological sites in Vietnam
Former national capitals
Former populated places in Vietnam
Phú Thọ province
Populated places established in the 3rd millennium BC